One Percent Panic is the second full-length album by the California rock band Viva Death. The album was released in 2006 on Functional Equivalent Recordings.

Track listing
 "Broken Nose"
 "Be Excited"
 "Suspect"
 "You Can't Love"
 "Behind You, Soldier"
 "United by the Threat of a Common Enemy"
 "Defector"
 "Rise and Shine"
 "The Fear"
 "Damage Control"
 "White Car"
 "Into the Void"

Credits
 Scott Shiflett – Baritone guitar, vocals
 Trever Keith – Baritone guitar, vocals
 Chris Shiflett – Baritone guitar
 Josh Freese – Drums
 Chad Blinman – Noises and Effects

Additional musicians
 Jason Freese (Baritone saxophone, Behind You, Soldier)
 Reiko Yoshida (Poetry reading, Defector)

References

Viva Death albums
2006 albums